The 2004 Southern Miss Golden Eagles football team represented the University of Southern Mississippi in the 2004 NCAA Division I-A football season. The Golden Eagles were led by head coach Jeff Bower and played their home games at M. M. Roberts Stadium. They were a member of Conference USA.

Schedule

References

Southern Miss
Southern Miss Golden Eagles football seasons
New Orleans Bowl champion seasons
Southern Miss Golden Eagles football